Edvard Hammond (1688–1711) was a Norwegian civil servant and politician.  He served as the County Governor of Stavanger amt from 1700 until 1710. He was then transferred to be the Diocesan Governor of Bergenhus stiftamt (and simultaneously serving as the County Governor of Bergenhus amt) from 1710 until his death in 1711.

References

1688 births
1711 deaths
County governors of Norway